No. 320 (Netherlands) Squadron RAF was a unit of the Royal Air Force during World War II formed from the personnel of the Royal Netherlands Naval Air Service.

History

Formation
Formed on 1 June 1940 at RAF Pembroke Dock, after flying from the Netherlands in eight Fokker T.VIIIW twin-engined patrol seaplanes, as part of Coastal Command. The squadron flew coastal and anti-submarine patrols in the Fokkers until they became unserviceable due to lack of spares and were re-equipped with Ansons in August 1940 and supplemented in October with Hudsons. Due to insufficient personnel, the squadron absorbed No. 321 (Netherlands) Squadron on 18 January 1941.

To Bomber Command
The squadron moved to RAF Leuchars on 1 October 1941, re-equipped with Hudson IIIs, flying patrols and anti-shipping attacks in the North Sea. Detachments were located at RAF Silloth and RAF Carew Cheriton until 24 April 1942 when the squadron moved to RAF Bircham Newton. The squadron was reassigned to Bomber Command and loaned to No.2 Group on 15 March 1943. The squadron was re-equipped with Mitchells during spring 1943 and moved to RAF Methwold.

In the 2nd Tactical Air Force

On 30 March 1943, the squadron moved to RAF Attlebridge, then was reassigned to Second Tactical Air Force on 1 June with the squadron attacking enemy communications targets and airfields. The squadron relocated to RAF Lasham on 30 August and to RAF Dunsfold on 18 February 1944.
From these airfields the squadron participated in many  "Ramrod" and "Noball" operations  and bombing attacks on construction works, railway yards, fuel dumps and V-1 flying bomb sites in the North of France, in advance of Normandy landings on 6 June 1944 (D-Day).

After D-Day the bombing of tactical targets continued and changed from France to the Dutch coast of Zeeland, and in September 1944 the squadron was involved in bombing German troops in the surroundings of Arnhem during the attempt by airborne troops to take the bridge. In September the squadron started bombing targets in Germany along the Rhine for the advancing allied troops. In October 1944 the squadron was transferred to Melsbroek (B.58), in Belgium. From there the bombing of bridges and airfields in the east of the Netherlands and Germany continued. During 1943 and 1944 the squadron took heavy losses. On 30 April 1945 the squadron moved to Advanced Landing Ground B.110 at Achmer, Lower Saxony in Germany.

Back home
The squadron was passed to the control of the Dutch Naval Aviation Service (Marine Luchtvaart Dienst) on 2 August 1945, keeping the same squadron number No. 320 Squadron MLD. The squadron was disbanded in 2005, due to budget cuts.

Aircraft operated

Commanding officers

References

Bibliography

 Geldof, Nico. De Vliegtuigen van 320 Squadron, 1940 – 1946 (in Dutch). Maarssen, the Netherlands: Geromy Uitgeverij BV, 2006. . 
 Geldof, Nico. De Operaties van 320 Squadron, 1940 – 1946 (in Dutch). Maarssen, the Netherlands: Geromy Uitgeverij BV, 2006. .
 Geldof, Nico. "'Alle Hens' van 320 Squadron: 'Regina et patria'" (in Dutch). Maarssen, the Netherlands: Geromy Uitgeverij BV, 2007. ISBN
 Halley, James J. The Squadrons of the Royal Air Force & Commonwealth 1918–1988. Tonbridge, Kent, UK: Air Britain (Historians) Ltd., 1988. .
 Jefford, C.G. RAF Squadrons, a Comprehensive Record of the Movement and Equipment of all RAF Squadrons and their Antecedents since 1912. Shrewsbury, Shropshire, UK: Airlife Publishing, 2001. .
 Kloos, J.P. 320 Squadron R.A.F., Memorial 1940–1945 (in Dutch). J.P. Kloos Publisher, 1987 (republished in 1992).    
 Moyes, Philip J.R. Bomber Squadrons of the RAF and their Aircraft. London: Macdonald and Jane's, 1964 (2nd edition 1976). . 
 Rawlings, John D.R. Coastal, Support and Special Squadrons of the RAF and their Aircraft. London: Jane's Publishing Company Ltd., 1982. .
 Van der Kop, Hans. The Flying Dutchman: An Exciting True Story of War in the Air. Wellingborough: Patrick Stephens Ltd, 1985. .

External links

 Squadron bases at RAF Commands
 320 Squadron History at RAF website
 No. 320 Squadron Aircraft & Markings on RAF Web
 History of No.'s 310–347 Squadrons at RAF Web
 History of 320 Squadron in Dutch

320
Military units and formations established in 1940
Aircraft squadrons of the Royal Air Force in World War II
Military units and formations of the Netherlands in World War II
Netherlands–United Kingdom military relations